Juan Carlos Salazar may refer to:
 Juan Carlos Salazar (musician), Venezuelan singer and cuatro player
 Juan Carlos Salazar Gómez, secretary-general of the International Civil Aviation Organization